Piya Sengupta (born in Kolkata, India) is an Indian actress and producer. She is known for her work in Bengali cinema. As an actress, she made her debut opposite Prosenjit Chatterjee in Sujit Guha's Dadamoni (1984).

Family and early life 

Her father was famous actor/director late Sukhen Das. Piya married director Anup Sengupta. Bonny Sengupta is their son, who is also an actor. She completed her schooling from Kamala Girls School, then graduated from Jogomaya Devi college, Kolkata.

Filmography

References

External links
 

Living people
Bengali actresses
Indian film actresses
Bengali Hindus
Indian Hindus
1969 births